Cappsia is a genus of snout moths. It was described by José A. Pastrana in 1953 and contains the species Cappsia bourquini. It is found in Argentina.

References

Chrysauginae
Monotypic moth genera
Moths of South America
Pyralidae genera